Fabio Salvatore Aveni (born 5 September 1994) is an Italian footballer who currently plays as a striker for Gela.

Club career 

Aveni is a youth exponent from Catania. He made his Serie A debut on 18 May 2014 in a 2-1 home win against Atalanta.

References

External links

1994 births
Living people
People from Barcellona Pozzo di Gotto
Italian footballers
Serie A players
Catania S.S.D. players
Association football forwards
Sportspeople from the Province of Messina
Footballers from Sicily